João Pedro Abreu de Oliveira (born 6 January 1996) is a Swiss footballer who plays for Portuguese club Leixões as a winger.

He also holds Portuguese citizenship.

Football career
On 18 July 2015, de Oliveira made his professional debut with FC Luzern in a 2015–16 Swiss Super League match against FC Sion.

On 15 August 2017 he was loaned to Ekstraklasa side Lechia Gdańsk.

References

External links

1996 births
Living people
Swiss men's footballers
Swiss people of Portuguese descent
Association football forwards
Swiss Super League players
FC Luzern players
Lechia Gdańsk players
FC Lausanne-Sport players
C.D. Cova da Piedade players
Leixões S.C. players
Ekstraklasa players
Liga Portugal 2 players
Expatriate footballers in Poland
Swiss expatriates in Poland
People from Nyon
Sportspeople from the canton of Vaud